James "Jim" Kielsmeier is founder and President/CEO of the National Youth Leadership Council, based in St. Paul, Minnesota. He also founded the Center for Experiential Education and Service-Learning at the University of Minnesota, where he is also an adjunct professor. Kielsmeier helped initiate the nonprofit African Reconciliation and Development Corps International and led their first project in Somalia (1993–94) during the civil war.

Biography

Kielsmeier spent time as a youth worker in Harlem, and then as a U.S. Army Infantry platoon leader and community relations officer in Korea during the 1960s. In Korea, he developed a program placing GIs as tutors in schools. A former middle and high school teacher and Outward Bound instructor, Kielsmeier founded the National Youth Leadership Council in 1983, initially based at the University of Minnesota.

Kielsmeier has also been engaged in the design and implementation of comprehensive state and federal youth service and service-learning models. He has advised three Minnesota governors, helped U.S. Senators Dave Durenberger and Paul Wellstone write the 1990 and 1993 National and Community Service Act, advised the Clinton and Obama Administrations’ transition teams, and testified before the Minnesota House and Senate and the U.S. House of Representatives. Kielsmeier also helped initiate the nonprofit African Reconciliation and Development Corps International, and led its first project to build schools in Somalia during the civil war in 1993. He is a member of the Board for the newly organized Bilingual Christian University of Congo.

Currently, Kielsmeier is an adjunct professor at the University of Minnesota. He earned a Ph.D. in education from the University of Colorado, a master's in international relations from American University in Washington, D.C., and a bachelor's degree from Wheaton College. In 2008 he was awarded an honorary Doctorate of Laws from Concordia University, St. Paul in Saint Paul. He is married to Rev. Deborah Eng Kielsmeier and is the father of three grown daughters.

Recognition
 Kurt Hahn Award of the Association for Experiential Education
 Lifetime Achievement Award of the National Indian Youth Leadership Project
 Rotary Club's Paul Harris Award
 George Norlin Award, the highest alumni recognition of the University of Colorado

See also
 National Youth Leadership Council
 National Service Learning Conference
 Service-learning
 Youth service
 AmeriCorps
 National service
 Youth Service America

References

American educators
Youth empowerment people
Living people
American nonprofit executives
Year of birth missing (living people)